Syrphus torvus, the  Hairy-eyed Flower Fly, is a common species of hoverfly found in the Holarctic. The adults feed on pollen and nectar, but the larvae feed on aphids.

Description
External images. For terminology see Speight key to genera and glossary. Eyes have numerous hairs, in male, long and dense, in female shorter. Femora 3 is black on basal 3/4. The male genitalia and the larva are illustrated by Dusek and Laska (1964).
See references for determination.

Distribution
Palearctic: Greenland and Fennoscandia southward to Iberia and the Mediterranean basin through Europe into Turkey and European Russia. Also from Urals eastward to Siberia and the Russian Far East to the Pacific coast (Kuril Isles) and Japan. Indomalaya Formosa, Northern India, Nepal, and Thailand.

Nearctic: from Alaska southward to New Mexico. Migratory.

Biology
Habitat: Abies, Picea and Pinus forest and Betula, Fagus, Quercus forest and dwarf-shrub tundra. It is synanthropic in suburban gardens with mature trees and in urban parks. Flowers visited include umbellifers, Allium ursinum, Aster, Bellis perennis, Brassica rapa, Buxus, Caltha, Cirsium arvense, Crataegus, Euphorbia, Frangula alnus, Glaux maritima, Hedera, Hieracium, Oxalis, Prunus spinosa, Ranunculus, Rosa, Rubus, Salix, Senecio jacobaea, Sorbus, Taraxacum, Tussilago.
It flies March to October. The larva feeds on aphids on trees, bushes and shrubs. Adults feed on pollen and nectar and are particularly attracted to yellow and white flowers. The insect overwinters as larvae.

References

Syrphinae
Syrphini
Insects described in 1875
Taxa named by Carl Robert Osten-Sacken
Diptera of Asia
Diptera of North America
Hoverflies of North America  
Diptera of Europe